Ana G. Casís was a Panamanian sociologist, statistician, and demographer who directed the 1950 Panamanian census, and later worked for the Inter-American Statistical Institute in Washington, DC. She is also known for her work with Kingsley Davis on urbanization in Latin America, Davis's first work on urbanization.

Casís earned a bachelor's degree in Panama in 1943, and a master's degree at Syracuse University in 1945, with the master's thesis "Population studies in Mexico, Panama, and Puerto Rico, with special reference to urbanization processes.

In 1979, she was named a Fellow of the American Statistical Association.

She died before 2012, when she was listed as a deceased former member by the Washington Statistical Society.

References

Year of birth missing (living people)
Living people
Panamanian sociologists
Panamanian women sociologists
Syracuse University alumni
Fellows of the American Statistical Association